The Churchill war ministry was the United Kingdom's coalition government for most of the Second World War from 10 May 1940 to 23 May 1945. It was led by Winston Churchill, who was appointed Prime Minister by King George VI following the resignation of Neville Chamberlain in the aftermath of the Norway Debate.

At the outset, Churchill formed a five-man war cabinet which included Chamberlain as Lord President of the Council, Clement Attlee as Lord Privy Seal and later as Deputy Prime Minister, Viscount Halifax as Foreign Secretary and Arthur Greenwood as a minister without portfolio. Although the original war cabinet was limited to five members, in practice they were augmented by the service chiefs and ministers who attended the majority of meetings. The cabinet changed in size and membership as the war progressed but there were significant additions later in 1940 when it was increased to eight after Churchill, Attlee and Greenwood were joined by Ernest Bevin as Minister of Labour and National Service; Anthony Eden as Foreign Secretary – replacing Halifax, who was sent to Washington D.C. as ambassador to the United States; Lord Beaverbrook as Minister of Aircraft Production; Sir Kingsley Wood as Chancellor of the Exchequer and Sir John Anderson as Lord President of the Council – replacing Chamberlain who died in November (Anderson later became Chancellor after Wood's death in September 1943).

The coalition was dissolved in May 1945, following the final defeat of Germany, when the Labour Party decided to withdraw in order to prepare for a general election. Churchill, who was the leader of the Conservative Party, was asked by the King to form a new, essentially Conservative, government. It was known as the Churchill caretaker ministry and managed the country's affairs until completion of the general election on 26 July that year.

Background

The 1935 general election had resulted in a Conservative victory with a substantial majority and Stanley Baldwin became Prime Minister. In May 1937, Baldwin retired and was succeeded by Neville Chamberlain who continued Baldwin's foreign policy of appeasement in the face of German, Italian and Japanese aggression. Having signed the Munich Agreement with Hitler in 1938, Chamberlain became alarmed by the dictator's continuing aggression and, in March 1939, signed the Anglo-Polish military alliance which supposedly guaranteed British support for Poland if attacked. Chamberlain issued the declaration of war against Germany on 3 September 1939 and formed a war cabinet which included Winston Churchill (out of office since June 1929) as First Lord of the Admiralty.

Dissatisfaction with Chamberlain's leadership became widespread in the spring of 1940 after Germany successfully invaded Norway. In response, the House of Commons held the Norway Debate from 7 to 9 May. At the end of the second day, the Labour opposition forced a division which was in effect a motion of no confidence in Chamberlain. The government's majority of 213 was reduced to 81, still a victory but nevertheless a shattering blow for Chamberlain.

9–31 May 1940: Creation of a new government

9 May – Chamberlain considers his options
On Thursday, 9 May, Chamberlain attempted to form a National Coalition Government. In talks at Downing Street with Viscount Halifax and Churchill, he indicated that he was quite ready to resign if that was necessary for Labour to enter such a government. Labour's leader Clement Attlee and his deputy Arthur Greenwood then joined the meeting, and when asked, they indicated that they must first consult their party's National Executive Committee (then in Bournemouth to prepare for the annual conference), but it was unlikely they could serve in a government led by Chamberlain; they probably would be able to serve under some other Conservative.

After Attlee and Greenwood left, Chamberlain asked whom he should recommend to the King as his successor. The version of events given by Churchill is that Chamberlain's preference for Halifax was obvious (Churchill implies that the spat between Churchill and the Labour benches the previous night had something to do with that); there was a long silence which Halifax eventually broke by saying he did not believe he could lead the government effectively as a member of the House of Lords instead of the House of Commons. Churchill's version gets the date wrong, and he fails to mention the presence of David Margesson, the government Chief Whip.

Halifax's account omits the dramatic pause and gives an additional reason: "PM said I was the man mentioned as most acceptable. I said it would be hopeless position. If I was not in charge of the war (operations) and if I didn't lead in the House, I should be a cypher. I thought Winston was a better choice. Winston did not demur." According to Halifax, Margesson then confirmed that the House of Commons had been veering to Churchill.

In a letter to Churchill written that night, Bob Boothby asserted that parliamentary opinion was hardening against Halifax, claiming in a postscript that according to Liberal MP Clement Davies, "Attlee & Greenwood are unable to distinguish between the PM & Halifax and are not prepared to serve under the latter". Davies (who thought Chamberlain should go, and be replaced by Churchill) had lunched with Attlee and Greenwood (and argued his case) shortly before they saw Chamberlain. Labour's Hugh Dalton, however, noted in his diary entry for 9 May that he had spoken with Attlee, who "agrees with my preference for Halifax over Churchill, but we both think either would be tolerable".

10 May – Churchill succeeds Chamberlain
On the morning of Friday, 10 May, Germany invaded the Netherlands, Belgium, and Luxembourg. Chamberlain initially felt that a change of government at such a time would be inappropriate, but upon being given confirmation that Labour would not serve under him, he announced to the war cabinet his intention to resign. Scarcely more than three days after he had opened the debate, Chamberlain went to Buckingham Palace to resign as Prime Minister. Despite resigning as PM, however, he continued to be the leader of the Conservative Party. He explained to the King why Halifax, whom the King thought the obvious candidate, did not want to become Prime Minister. The King then sent for Churchill and asked him to form a new government; according to Churchill, there was no stipulation that it must be a coalition government.

At 21:00 on 10 May, Chamberlain announced the change of Prime Minister over the BBC. Churchill's first act as Prime Minister was to ask Attlee and Greenwood to come and see him at Admiralty House. Next, he wrote to Chamberlain to thank him for his promised support. He then began to construct his coalition cabinet with the assistance of Attlee and Greenwood. Their conference went on into the early hours of Saturday and they reached a broad agreement on the composition of the new war cabinet, subject to Labour Party confirmation. Attlee and Greenwood were confident of securing this on Saturday after Churchill promised that more than a third of government positions would be offered to Labour members, including some of the key posts.

11/12 May – formation of the national government

On Saturday, 11 May, the Labour Party agreed to join a national government under Churchill's leadership and he was able to confirm his war cabinet. In his biography of Churchill, Roy Jenkins described the Churchill cabinet as one "for winning", while the former Chamberlain cabinet was one "for losing". Labour leader Clement Attlee relinquished his official role as Leader of the Opposition to become Lord Privy Seal (until 19 February 1942 when he was appointed Deputy Prime Minister). Arthur Greenwood, Labour's deputy leader, was appointed a minister without portfolio.

There was no de facto Leader of the Opposition from 11 May 1940 until Attlee resumed the role on 23 May 1945. The Labour Party appointed an acting Leader of the Opposition whose job, although he was in effect a member of the national government, was to ensure the continued functionality of the House of Commons. Due process in the Commons requires someone, even a member of the government, to fill the role even if there is no actual opposition. The first acting leader was Hastings Lees-Smith, the MP for Keighley, who died in office on 18 December 1941. He was briefly succeeded by Frederick Pethick-Lawrence and then by Arthur Greenwood, who had left the war cabinet, from 22 February 1942 until 23 May 1945.

The main problem for Churchill as he became Prime Minister was that he was not the leader of the majority Conservative Party and, needing its support, was obliged to include Chamberlain in the war cabinet, but this was not to Labour's liking. Initially, Churchill proposed to appoint Chamberlain as both Leader of the House of Commons and Chancellor of the Exchequer. Attlee objected and Churchill decided to appoint Chamberlain as Lord President of the Council. The fifth member of the war cabinet was Halifax, who retained his position as Foreign Secretary. Instead of Chamberlain, Sir Kingsley Wood became Chancellor but, until 3 October 1940, he was not a member of the war cabinet.

Churchill appointed himself as Leader of the House of Commons (it was normal procedure until 1942 for a prime minister in the Commons to lead the House) and created for himself the new role of Minister of Defence, so that he would be permanent chair of the Cabinet Defence Committee (CDC), Operations, which included the three service ministers, the three Chiefs of Staff (CoS) and other ministers, especially Attlee, and experts as and when required. The CDC was established by Churchill as soon as he took office. It was the key organisation through which the government prosecuted the war, especially in 1940 and 1941. From 1942, as the tide of war began to turn in favour of the Allies, the importance of the CDC was reduced and its meetings became fewer as its work was increasingly delegated or raised at conferences.

Anthony Eden became Secretary of State for War (until December 1940); Labour's A. V. Alexander succeeded Churchill as First Lord of the Admiralty; and the Liberal Party leader, Sir Archibald Sinclair, became Secretary of State for Air. The CoS at this time were Admiral Sir Dudley Pound, the First Sea Lord; Air Marshal Sir Cyril Newall, the Chief of the Air Staff; and Field Marshal Sir Edmund Ironside, the Chief of the Imperial General Staff (CIGS). (On 27 May, Ironside was replaced at Churchill's request by his deputy Field Marshal Sir John Dill, and Ironside became Commander-in-Chief, Home Forces.) The CoS continued to hold their own Chiefs of Staff Committee (CSC) meetings. The CDC enabled Churchill to have direct contact with them so that strategic concerns could be addressed with due regard to civil matters and foreign affairs.

In addition, for the ministry's whole term, both the war cabinet and the CDC were regularly attended by Sir Edward Bridges, the Cabinet Secretary; General Sir Hastings Ismay, Chief of Staff to the Minister of Defence; and Major General Sir Leslie Hollis, Secretary to the Chiefs of Staff Committee. Bridges was rarely absent from war cabinet sessions. He was appointed by Chamberlain – as a senior civil servant, he was not a political appointee – in August 1938 and remained in situ until 1946. Churchill later described Bridges as "an extremely competent and tireless worker". Ismay's role, technically, was Secretary of the CSC but he was in fact Churchill's chief staff officer and military adviser throughout the war. Hollis was Secretary to the CoS Committee, also for the duration, and he additionally served as senior assistant secretary to Bridges in the war cabinet office.

13 May – Churchill's first speech as Prime Minister
By Monday, 13 May, most of the senior government posts were filled. That day was Whit Monday, normally a bank holiday but cancelled by the incoming government. A specially convened sitting of the House of Commons was held and Churchill spoke for the first time as Prime Minister:

He explained that a war cabinet of five members had been formed to represent the unity of the nation with all three main party leaders agreeing to serve either in the war cabinet or in high executive office. Churchill was hoping to complete all ministerial appointments by the end of the 14th. He announced an adjournment of Commons business until the 21st and apologised for making only a short address for the present. Even so, his speech has become one of his most famous because he concluded with his statement of intent:

In reply, Hastings Lees-Smith as acting Leader of the Opposition announced that Labour would vote for the motion to assure the country of a unified political front. After several other members had spoken, including David Lloyd George and Stafford Cripps, the House divided on the question: "That this House welcomes the formation of a Government representing the united and inflexible resolve of the nation to prosecute the war with Germany to a victorious conclusion". 381 members voted "aye" in favour of the motion and, apart from the two tellers for the "noes", the wartime coalition was endorsed unanimously.

Meanwhile, the Labour Party's conference had gone ahead as planned. On the 13th, Attlee spoke to confirm that the party was now in coalition with the Conservatives and Liberals as a national government. He told the conference that: "We are trying to form a government that should rally all the nation and set forth the energies of the people". He added that he had "not the slightest doubt about our victory".

14–17 May – Completion of government membership
Apart from a handful of junior appointments such as royal household positions, Churchill completed the construction of his government by the end of his first week in office. Only two women were appointed to government positions – Florence Horsbrugh, who had previously been a Conservative backbench MP, became Parliamentary Secretary to the Ministry of Health on 15 May; and Labour's Ellen Wilkinson, the most left-wing member of Churchill's ministry, became Parliamentary Secretary to the Ministry of Pensions on the 17th.

18 May to 4 June – War cabinet crisis

The war situation in Europe became increasingly critical for the Allies as the Wehrmacht overran northern France and the Low Countries through May, culminating in the siege of Dunkirk and the desperate need to evacuate the British Expeditionary Force by Operation Dynamo. In the war cabinet, Churchill faced a serious challenge by Halifax to his direction of the war. Halifax wanted to sue for peace by asking Mussolini to broker a treaty between the British government and Hitler. Churchill wanted to continue the war. Attlee and Greenwood supported Churchill while Chamberlain, still the leader of the majority Conservative Parliamentary Party, remained neutral for several days until finally aligning himself with Churchill's resolve to fight on.

5 June 1940 to 30 April 1941
 2 August 1940: Lord Beaverbrook, Minister of Aircraft Production, joined the war cabinet.
 22 September 1940: resignation of Neville Chamberlain for health reasons (terminal colon cancer).
 3 October 1940: Sir John Anderson succeeded Chamberlain as Lord President and joined the war cabinet. Sir Kingsley Wood, the Chancellor of the Exchequer, and Ernest Bevin, the Minister of Labour, also entered the war cabinet. Lord Halifax assumed the additional job of Leader of the House of Lords.
 25 October 1940: Air Marshal Sir Cyril Newall was persuaded to take retirement and was replaced by Sir Charles Portal, who had been C-in-C of Bomber Command.
 9 November 1940: death of Neville Chamberlain.
 22 December 1940: Anthony Eden succeeded Lord Halifax as Foreign Secretary (Eden held the post until 26 July 1945) and joined the war cabinet as its eighth member. Halifax became Ambassador to the United States. His successor as Leader of the House of Lords was not in the war cabinet.
 30 April 1941: Beaverbrook ceased to be Minister of Aircraft Production, but remained in the war cabinet as Minister of State (appointed 1 May 1941). His successor was not in the war cabinet.

1 May 1941 to 30 April 1942

 29 June 1941: Beaverbrook became Minister of Supply, remaining in the war cabinet. Oliver Lyttelton entered the war cabinet as Minister-Resident for the Middle East.
 25 December 1941: Sir John Dill was replaced as CIGS by Field Marshal Sir Alan Brooke. Dill became Chief of the British Joint Staff Mission in Washington, DC. Brooke had been General Ironside's successor as C-in-C, Home Forces, since July 1940.
 4 February 1942: Beaverbrook resigned from Supply and was appointed  Minister of War Production; his successor as Minister of Supply was not in the war cabinet.
 15 February 1942: Attlee relinquished the Lord Privy Seal to become Secretary of State for Dominion Affairs, the first time this office was represented in the war cabinet.
 19 February 1942: Attlee was appointed Deputy Prime Minister with general responsibility for domestic affairs. Beaverbrook again resigned but no replacement as Minister of War Production was appointed for the moment. Sir Stafford Cripps succeeded Attlee as Lord Privy Seal and took over the position of Leader of the House of Commons to reduce Churchill's workload. Sir Kingsley Wood left the war cabinet, though remaining Chancellor of the Exchequer.
 22 February 1942: Arthur Greenwood left the war cabinet to assume the role of Leader of the Opposition, necessary for House of Commons functionality, till 23 May 1945.
 12 March 1942: Oliver Lyttelton filled the vacant position of Minister of Production ("War" was dropped from the title). Richard Casey succeeded Oliver Lyttelton as Minister-Resident for the Middle East.

1 May 1942 to 30 April 1943
 22 November 1942: Sir Stafford Cripps retired as Lord Privy Seal and Leader of the House of Commons and left the war cabinet. His successor as Lord Privy Seal (Viscount Cranborne) was not in the Cabinet, Anthony Eden took the additional position of Leader of the House of Commons. The Home Secretary, Herbert Morrison, entered the Cabinet.

1 May 1943 to 30 April 1944
 21 September 1943: Death of Sir Kingsley Wood.
 24 September 1943: Anderson succeeded Wood as Chancellor of the Exchequer, remaining in the war cabinet.
 24 September 1943: Attlee left Dominions to succeed Anderson as Lord President. Except during Attlee's tenure, Dominions was not a war cabinet portfolio. Attlee remained Deputy PM and Lord President until termination of the ministry on 23 May 1945.
 15 October 1943: Due to failing health, Sir Dudley Pound had to resign as First Sea Lord. He died six days later. He was succeeded by Admiral of the Fleet Sir Andrew Cunningham, who had been Commander-in-Chief of the Mediterranean Fleet. 
 11 November 1943: Lord Woolton joined the war cabinet as Minister of Reconstruction.
 14 January 1944: Lord Moyne replaced Richard Casey as Minister-Resident for the Middle East.

1 May 1944 to 22 May 1945
 6 June 1944: D-Day.
 6 November 1944: Lord Moyne was assassinated in Cairo by Jewish militants. His successor was not in the war cabinet.
 25 April 1945: Attlee, Eden, Florence Horsbrugh and Ellen Wilkinson were Britain's delegates at the San Francisco Conference.
 30 April 1945: Death of Hitler.
 8 May 1945: VE Day. The war cabinet members then were Churchill, Attlee, Anderson, Bevin, Eden, Lyttelton, Morrison and Woolton.

23 May 1945 – End of the ministry
In October 1944, Churchill had proposed to the Commons that the current Parliament, which had begun in 1935, should be extended by a further year. He correctly anticipated the defeat of Germany in the spring of 1945 but he did not expect the end of the Far East war until 1946. He therefore recommended that the end of the European war should be "a pointer (to) fix the date of the (next) General Election".

Attlee, along with Eden, Horsbrugh and Wilkinson, attended the San Francisco Conference and had returned to London by 18 May 1945 (ten days after V-E Day) when he met Churchill to discuss the future of the coalition. Attlee, in agreement with Churchill, wanted it to continue until after the Japanese surrender but he discovered that others in the Labour Party, especially Morrison and Bevin, wanted an election in October after Parliament ended. On 20 May, Attlee attended his party conference and found that opinion was against him so he informed Churchill that Labour must leave the coalition.

On 23 May, Labour left the coalition to begin their general election campaign. Churchill resigned as prime minister but the King asked him to form a new government, known as the Churchill caretaker ministry, until the election was held in July. Churchill agreed and his new ministry, essentially a Conservative one, held office for the next two months until it was replaced by Attlee's Labour government after their election victory.

Government members

Ministers who held war cabinet membership, 10 May 1940 – 23 May 1945
A total of sixteen ministers held war cabinet membership at various times in Churchill's ministry. There were five at the outset of whom two, Churchill and Attlee, served throughout the ministry's entire term. Bevin, Morrison and Wood were appointed to the war cabinet while retaining offices that had originally been outer cabinet portfolios. Anderson and Eden were promoted to the war cabinet from other offices after their predecessors, Chamberlain and Halifax, had left the government; similarly, Casey was brought in after Lyttelton switched portfolio and Moyne was appointed to replace Casey. Beaverbrook, Lyttelton and Woolton were brought in to fill new offices that were created to address current priorities. Greenwood was an original member with no portfolio and was not replaced when he assumed the acting leadership of the Opposition. Cripps was brought in as an extra member to reduce the workloads of Churchill and Attlee.

Senior government ministries and offices, 10 May 1940 – 23 May 1945
This table lists cabinet level ministries and offices during the Churchill administration. Most of these were portfolios in the "outer cabinet" and outside the war cabinet, although some were temporarily included in the war cabinet, as indicated by bold highlighting of the ministers concerned. Focus here is upon the ministerial offices. Some ministries, such as Foreign Secretary, were in the war cabinet throughout the entire administration whereas others like Lord Privy Seal, Chancellor of the Exchequer and Home Secretary were sometimes in the war cabinet and sometimes not, depending on priorities at the time. A number of ministries were created by Churchill in response to wartime needs. Some of the ministers retained offices that they held in former administrations and their notes include the date of their original appointment. For new appointments to existing offices, their predecessor's name is given.

Financial and parliamentary secretaries, 10 May 1940 – 23 May 1945
This table lists the junior offices (often ministerial level 3) that held the title of Financial Secretary and/or Parliamentary Secretary. None of these officials were ever in the war cabinet. Their offices have rarely, if ever, been recognised as cabinet-level, although some of the office holders here did, at need, occasionally attend cabinet meetings. Some of the appointees retained offices that they held in former administrations and these are marked in situ with the date of their original appointment.

Other junior ministries, 10 May 1940 – 23 May 1945
This table lists the junior offices (often ministerial level 3) whose titles signify an assistant, deputy or under-secretary function. It excludes financial and parliamentary secretaries who are in the table above. None of these officials were ever in the war cabinet. Their offices have rarely, if ever, been recognised as cabinet-level, although some of the office holders here did, at need, occasionally attend cabinet meetings. Some of the appointees retained offices that they held in former administrations and these are marked in situ with the date of their original appointment.

Royal household appointments, 10 May 1940 – 23 May 1945
This table lists the officers appointed to the royal household during the Churchill administration.

See also
 Allied leaders of World War II
 Timeline of the first premiership of Winston Churchill
 Winston Churchill in the Second World War

References

Bibliography

External links
 
 
 

1940 establishments in the United Kingdom
1940s in the United Kingdom
1945 disestablishments in the United Kingdom
British ministries
Cabinets disestablished in 1945
Cabinets established in 1940
Coalition governments of the United Kingdom
Grand coalition governments
History of the Labour Party (UK)
 
Politics of World War II
United Kingdom in World War II-related lists
United Kingdom in World War II
Ministry 1